K+ or K+ may refer to:

 A positively charged potassium ion
 A positively charged kaon particle
 K+ (mixtape), by Kilo Kish, 2013
 K+, a family of Vietnamese premium television channels jointly owned by Groupe Canal+ and VTV